The Arie Crown Theater is an entertainment venue named after Lithuanian immigrant Arie Crown, who was the father of Henry Crown, the American industrialist and philanthropist, and situated on Lake Shore Drive, Chicago. It opened in 1960, with seating for 5,000 people, one of the largest seating capacities in Chicago. The theater is part of the McCormick Place convention facility, owned by the Metropolitan Pier and Exposition Authority.

The theatre was damaged by a fire in 1967 and was closed until 1971. After re-opening in January for Mahalia Jackson's funeral, the Arie Crown has, for more than five decades, presented classical, R&B, and rock music, along with musicals and plays.

Notable performers at the Arie Crown have included iconic stars such as Frank Sinatra, Judy Garland, Barbra Streisand, Ella Fitzgerald, Lena Horne, The Rolling Stones, Genesis, The Beach Boys, Simon & Garfunkel, Ray Charles, Aretha Franklin, Richard Pryor, Tina Turner, Liberace, Sammy Davis Jr., The Jackson 5, Whitney Houston, Liza Minnelli, James Brown, Sonny & Cher, Patti LaBelle, Anita Baker, The Temptations,  Tyler Perry, Gladys Knight, Diana Ross , Mary J. Blige, David Bowie and Katt Williams among others.

In more recent years, the acoustics have been improved by changing the proportions of the auditorium and staging area and this has reduced the seating capacity to 4,188 people.

References

Hjort, Chris and Hinman, Doug. Jeff's book : A chronology of Jeff Beck's career 1965-1980 : from the Yardbirds to Jazz-Rock.  Rock 'n' Roll Research Press, (2000).

External links

1960s architecture in the United States
1960 establishments in Illinois
McCormick Place
Theatres completed in 1960
Theatres in Chicago